Hot Streets is an American adult animated television series that was created by Brian Wysol. The series surrounds the supernatural investigations of FBI agent Mark Branski, who works with his partner Donald French, Branski's niece Jen, and her cowardly talking dog, Chubbie Webbers. It is produced by Stoopid Buddy Stoodios, Williams Street, and Justin Roiland's Solo Vanity Card Productions!. The series premiered on January 14, 2018. It was renewed for a second season on May 7, 2018, which premiered on February 24, 2019.

On May 16, 2019, Adult Swim canceled the series after two seasons.

Plot
Mark Branski (J.D. Ryznar) is an FBI agent along with his partner Donald French (Scott Chernoff). The two collaborate with Branski's niece Jen (Chelsea Kane) and her cowardly talking dog, Chubbie Webbers (Justin Roiland), to investigate paranormal phenomena. A recurring theme of the show is how they mostly go up against nasty, nasty monsters and wacky forces of evil, yet sometimes kill good-intentioned "adversaries" without a second thought, often based on just following orders, heated emotions or the Bible.

Characters
 Mark Branski (voiced by J.D. Ryznar), an FBI agent who is a 21-year veteran and is considered the best at his job. He has a somewhat eccentric and aloof attitude towards the various missions and events and tends to disregard the feelings and opinions of those around him. Branski has a surprising knowledge of many things and partakes in various surreal activities. He gave Chubbie Webbers his name after Jen adopted him.
 Donald French (voiced by Scott Chernoff), Branski's younger partner and essentially everyone's whipping boy. French is effeminate and more pessimistic compared to Branski, but is always trying to prove his worth. In some instances he is shown to be smarter than his senior partner, but more often, he is incompetent in everything he tries. He desires to have his own office despite being told that there are no free office rooms anymore.
 Jen Sanders (voiced by Chelsea Kane), Branski's niece. Her parents died previously, her mother having died of blood cancer, and she constantly mentions that Branski is her only living relative. She confides in her dog Chubbie Webbers whom she loves dearly. Jen is more mentally capable than either Branski or French, but is usually put to the sideline by her uncle whom she still cares for.
 Chubbie Webbers (voiced by Justin Roiland), Jen's pet talking bloodhound who speaks with a garbled dog like voice (à la Scooby-Doo, though it becomes more intelligible in Season 2) and has an extended family (à la Snoopy). While Chubbie Webbers is very resourceful with a bisexual preference, both his slightly psychotic episodes and addiction problems tend to go unnoticed by the others. In the episode "The Final Stand", due to using the Badge Swords in "Super Agent", Chubbie fought and won a battle against blood cancer. "Super Agent 2" reveals that as a puppy, he was another girl's Christmas gift (given the name Wags), but he fled their burning house, unable to save the family. Soon after, Jen adopted him after her mother narrowly avoided hitting him while driving.
 Soo Park (voiced by Ming-Na Wen), Branski and French's boss in Season 1 who takes her job seriously. She has little patience for Branski's often idiotic attitude. After her firing in the Season 2 premiere, she becomes suspicious of her replacement and begins investigating him.
 John Wayne JetWayne Junior (Jet Jr.) (voiced by Ernie Hudson), Baranski and French's boss in Season 2. He is a living miniature jet plane who can shoot energy from his eyes that transforms those they hit into crystals. He has a higher tolerance for Branski than Soo Park and is far more eccentric, though he encourages his agents to complete their missions "tip to the lip", meaning as well done as possible. The season 2 finale reveals even though he is physically over 700 years old, for his species he's only a 12 year old, which explains all of his odd decisions and personality.
 Larry Sanders-Webbers (voiced by Katrina Johnson), Chubbie and Jen's talking squirrel friend who does science projects and pranks whenever his huge belly gurgles for food. He wears a green sweater, toeless socks and cap, then slaps Chubbie, in a black cropped hoodie, gloves and also toeless socks, Jen, in a red long-sleeved shirt, blue pants and then a orange jacket, French, now with hair, and Branski in the faces, tricking them.

Production
Prior to Hot Streets, Brian Wysol created a series of shorts for Dan Harmon and Rob Schrab's Channel 101 including Hot Cross Buns and We Solve the Crime. Wysol said Hot Streets was a synthesis of the two: "One was a supernatural horror cartoon and the other was a cop show, and they were my favorites [...] I wanted to weave their sensibilities together, so I came up with the idea for this new FBI supernatural investigative show." In 2012, Wysol decided to combine them for Hot Streets.

Wysol was employed on several Adult Swim series, including the second season of Rick and Morty as a story editor and Robot Chicken as a writer. Prior to that he created several web series for Smosh's Shut Up! Cartoons. In March 2017, the network announced that they committed Wysol's pitch for Hot Streets to a full series, along with Myles Langlois' Apollo Gauntlet. Stoopid Buddy Stoodios and Williams Street helm production. The former company's founders, Seth Green and Matthew Senreich—both the creators of Robot Chicken—announced that production for the pilot of Hot Streets was forthcoming in May 2015; it continued into April 2016. Green, Senreich, and Wysol are the series' executive producers, as well as fellow Robot Chicken staffer Eric Towner, John Harvatine IV, and Rick and Morty co-creator Justin Roiland. Each episode of Hot Streets is eleven minutes long. Animation services were provided by Salty Dog Pictures for the show's first season.

Episodes

Pilot (2016)

Season 1 (2018)

Season 2 (2019)

Short (2017)

Release and reception
Hot Streets premiered on Adult Swim on January 14, 2018. The pilot episode aired on December 4, 2016, and was previously released on Adult Swim's official website in August 2016, along with the pilots for three other prospective television series, including Apollo Gauntlet. Viewers could give feedback on each pilot with five buttons marked with reactions.

References

External links

 

2010s American adult animated television series
2010s American mystery television series
2018 American television series debuts
2019 American television series endings
American adult animated mystery television series
English-language television shows
Adult Swim original programming
Television series about the Federal Bureau of Investigation
Television series by Williams Street
Television series by Justin Roiland's Solo Vanity Card Productions!
Television series by Stoopid Buddy Stoodios